Long-tailed climbing mouse may refer to:
 Atlantic Forest climbing mouse (Rhipidomys mastacalis), an arboreal rodent species found in the Atlantic Forest of southeastern Brazil
 Cerrado climbing mouse (Rhipidomys macrurus), an arboreal rodent found in central and eastern Brazil
 Vandeleuria, a genus of rodent from Asia with only three species

Animal common name disambiguation pages